Fufore is a town and Local Government Area of Adamawa State, Nigeria.

Languages
The languages spoken in Fufore LGA are,
Fulani 
Gengle
Koma
Kugama
Kumba
Mboi
Mumuye
Verre
Bata

Displaced people
In 2014, people fleeing violence in Gwoza built a new town in Fufore, at the existing hamlet of Daware (or Damare), off the Yola-Mubi highway. "The condition given for their stay in Daware was that no temporary tents will be erected as the new residents have been allotted both farm and building plots to begin normal life." A school was set up at Damare Camp for the children, with teachers volunteering from the Modibbo Adama University of Technology, Yola, and American University of Nigeria, Yola.

References 

4. El-lainde's de second @babaali first edition 2019

Local Government Areas in Adamawa State